The Women's time trial at the 2002 UCI Road World Championships took place over a distance of  in Heusden-Zolder, in the province of Limburg, Belgium on 9 October 2002.

Final classification

Source

References

Women's Time Trial
UCI Road World Championships – Women's time trial
2002 in women's road cycling
Circuit Zolder
UCI